Scutellaria alabamensis, known as Alabama skullcap, is a rare and endangered wildflower, endemic only to 9 counties in North central Alabama.

Description
Alabama skullcap is an erect perennial herb, usually 4.5–6 cm tall, that produces blue and white flowers in an elongated cluster (rarely, flanked by 2 lateral clusters). Blooms early June-early July.

It is one of 300-400 members of the Scutellaria genus of flowering plants, commonly known as skullcaps.
.
The skullcap name is because of the resemblance to medieval helmets.

References

External links
 https://davesgarden.com/guides/pf/go/238086/#b

alabamensis